David Andrés Monsalve  (born December 21, 1988) is a Canadian former professional soccer player who played as a goalkeeper and who currently serves as goalkeeper coach for Toronto FC II.

Club career

Toronto FC
He was brought in during the 2007 season by Toronto FC as an injury relief player, as he was signed as an MLS Pool goalkeeper. Monsalve made his MLS and professional debut on July 29 against the Chicago Fire. He is the one of the youngest goalkeepers to play a game in the MLS. He was also the goalkeeper in a friendly against Aston Villa a couple of days earlier. Although both games were lost by TFC he impressed both his manager and the fans with his abilities. His MLS rights are held by Toronto FC. On July 27 he was called up for the game against New York Red Bulls. He also joined FC Dallas on an emergency basis, but did not play.

After his tenure with Toronto he played in the Canadian Soccer League with the North York Astros.

Inter Turku
He was on trial in Norway for Lillestrøm SK and later signed with FC Inter Turku for the next three seasons.

Monsalve made his Veikkausliiga and FC Inter Turku debut on July 1 against Tampere United. He replaced the first choice goalkeeper Patrick Bantamoi who had been sent off previous game against HJK on 85 minutes and had been banned. Monsalve was also sent off. He was replaced by FC Inter Turku's third goalkeeper young Eemeli Reponen. Third game in row with different goalkeeper at start XI.

On October 31, 2009, Monsalve got to lift the Finnish Cup trophy for the first time in his club's (FC Inter Turku) history. Monsalve played the whole match in goal when his team beat Tampere United 1–2.

On January 28, 2011 it was verified that Monsalve was on trial with his former team Toronto FC, and was making the pre-season trip to Turkey. He was one of three Canadian Internationals that were on trial for the MLS side, Eddy Sidra and midfielder Gianluca Zavarise.

FC Edmonton
On August 3, 2011 Monslave signed with FC Edmonton in the North American Soccer League. The club re-signed Monsalve for the 2012 season on October 12, 2011.

AC Oulu
Monsalve joined AC Oulu in early 2013 and spent two season with the club in the Ykkönen.

América de Cali
Monsalve returned to North America after the 2014 Ykkönen season to try and sign a contract closer to home. He trialed with the Jacksonville Armada ahead of their inaugural season in the NASL. Monsalve would reveal after his trial ended that he was asked by Jacksonville if he could quit playing soccer for a year and wait to receive a U.S. green card so he could sign with the team and not take up an international spot.

Monsalve refused and he went to Colombia and signed for América de Cali in the Categoría Primera B in early January 2015. He made his debut in a promotion play-off tournament match against Deportivo Pereira on January 21, which ended in a 1–1 draw. Monsalve made his league debut against Universitario Popayán, coming in as a substitute after an injury to starting goalkeeper John Meneses.

Suchitepéquez
Monsalve signed with Suchitepéquez in January 2016, and made his club debut later in the same month, becoming the first Canadian goalkeeper to play professionally in Guatemala

Vaughan Azzurri
After stints in Finland and Sweden, Monsalve returned to Canada and joined League1 Ontario side Vaughan Azzurri in August 2017, making one appearance.

Ottawa Fury
After a two-week trial, Monsalve signed with USL side Ottawa Fury FC on 12 February 2018. Monsalve re-signed with the Ottawa Fury FC in November, 2018. After two seasons with the Fury, the club would cease operations for the 2020 season, making Monsalve a free agent.

Forge FC
On March 2, 2020, Monsalve signed with Canadian Premier League side Forge FC.

Xelajú
In July 2020 Monsalve returned to Guatemala and joined Liga Nacional club Xelajú.

International career

Youth
During July 2007 David was a member of the Canada's Under-20 national team that competed in the 2007 U-20 World Cup in Canada.

During March 2008 he was on the roster of the Canadian U-23 men's national soccer team which had placed 3rd in the 2008 CONCACAF Men's Olympic Qualification Tournament.

Senior
Monsalve received his first international cap in a friendly match versus Jamaica on January 31, 2010.

More than five years after his debut and only cap, Monsalve was set to be called up for friendlies against Guatemala and Puerto Rico in March 2015, but declined the call due to a goalkeeper injury crisis at his club, América de Cali.

Coaching career
After his playing career, he became the assistant and goalkeeper coach for Ontario Tech University's men's and women's teams as well as Technical Director of North York F.C. In 2021, he was announced as an assistant coach for the women's team of the Simcoe County Rovers in League1 Ontario for the 2022 season, however, he later joined Toronto FC II as their goalkeepers coach instead.

Personal life
Monsalve's parents were both born in Colombia and he can speak both English and Spanish.

Career statistics

Honours

Inter Turku
 Finnish Cup: 2009

References

External links
GoTorontoFC.com Profile

1988 births
Living people
Association football goalkeepers
Canadian soccer players
Sportspeople from North York
Soccer players from Toronto
Canadian people of Colombian descent
Canadian expatriate soccer players
Expatriate footballers in Finland
Canadian expatriate sportspeople in Finland
Expatriate footballers in Colombia
Canadian expatriate sportspeople in Colombia
Expatriate footballers in Guatemala
Canadian expatriate sportspeople in Guatemala
Expatriate footballers in Sweden
Canadian expatriate sportspeople in Sweden
Toronto FC players
North York Astros players
FC Inter Turku players
FC Edmonton players
AC Oulu players
América de Cali footballers
C.D. Suchitepéquez players
Husqvarna FF players
Ottawa Fury FC players
Forge FC players
Xelajú MC players
Major League Soccer players
Canadian Soccer League (1998–present) players
Veikkausliiga players
Kakkonen players
North American Soccer League players
Ykkönen players
Categoría Primera B players
Liga Nacional de Fútbol de Guatemala players
Ettan Fotboll players
League1 Ontario players
USL Championship players
Canada men's youth international soccer players
Canada men's under-23 international soccer players
Canada men's international soccer players
Vaughan Azzurri players
Toronto FC II coaches
Association football goalkeeping coaches